The Elementary Particles is a 2021 French television drama film directed by Antoine Garceau for France 2. It is based on the novel Atomised by Michel Houellebecq and has a screenplay by Gilles Taurand. It stars Guillaume Gouix and Jean-Charles Clichet and tells the story of two half brothers, where the first half of the film is about their adolescence and the second is about them as adults.

It premiered on 17 September 2021 at the Festival La Rochelle Cinéma, where it was shown out of competition as a two-part television film. It was changed into one film of 1 hour and 58 minutes before it was shown on France 2 on 31 January 2022. It had 2 million viewers, which was 10% of the viewership.

References

External links
 

2021 television films
French television films
Films based on works by Michel Houellebecq
Films based on French novels
French drama films
Films about brothers
Films about dysfunctional families
Films about sexuality
2021 drama films